PAF Air War College Institute is the Pakistan Air Force academic establishment providing training and education primarily to the mid-career officers of PAF as well as to limited number of officers from Pakistan Navy, Pakistan Army and officers of various Allied forces. It is located at PAF Base Faisal in the city of Karachi.

The college was previously affiliated with University of Karachi but has recently been affiliated with the National Defence University (NDU) along with other staff and war colleges of Pakistan Army and Navy.

History
The College was established at PAF Station, Drigh Road, (now known as PAF Base Faisal) on 5 January 1959 with a Commandant borrowed on secondment from the Royal Air Force (RAF). The college was housed in a converted hospital building at the Station and was inaugurated by Field Marshal Muhammad Ayub Khan, the then President of Pakistan. After conducting the initial courses, the RAF component of the faculty which comprised three officers reverted to their parent organization in December 1963. The college was then taken over entirely by the officers from Pakistan Air Force.

In 1980, the BDM cell (Bachelor of Defence Management cell) was established for conducting Bachelor of Defence Management courses and was affiliated with the Institute of Business Administration, Karachi University for award of degrees. Owing to the changing environment, geo-strategic compulsions and rapid diffusion of high technology in modern warfare, PAF realized the need for a higher institution, exclusively devoted to the study of war and related matters. As such, in 1987, the Staff College was upgraded to the level of an Air War College. Some major structural changes were made in the course curriculum and the 45 weeks course was upgraded to an Air War Course (AWC). In 1989, the strength of students was enhanced to include officers from friendly countries and the entire organisation was shifted into a newly constructed, purpose built building in 1990. The new structure was inaugurated by President Ghulam Ishaq Khan, the then President of Pakistan, on 8 December 1991.

In August, 2007, the In-Service Education Scheme for mid-career officers was revitalized and replaced with Officers’ Military Education (OME) in which the whole officers training programme was brought under the administrative and functional control of Commandant, Air War College.  Resultantly, Basic Staff School (BSS) and Junior Command and Staff School (JC&SS) were merged into one institution named as the JC&SS at PAF Camp Badaber.

At the PAF Air War College, Sharah-e-Faisal, the SC&SC and AWC have been successfully and consistently meeting all their training objectives to date. Till August, 2010, a total of 28 Staff Courses, 54 Senior Command and Staff Courses and 23 Air War Courses have graduated from this institution.

Courses

The college runs two types of courses; Air War Course (AWC) and Senior Command and Staff Course (SC&SC). The former is to prepare senior officers of the Pakistan Air Force and other Allied officers for "senior command and staff appointments", whereas the latter is to "prepare mid-career PAF officers for assuming command and staff assignments commensurate with their rank and experience. On successful completion of War Course, the participants are awarded 'fawc' symbol by the College and M.Sc. in War Studies by National Defence University, Islamabad.

Organization
PAF Air War College is headed by Commandant of the rank of Air Vice Marshal. Under Commandant are Deputy Commandant/Chief Instructor War Wing, Chief Instructor Staff Wing both are of the rank of Air Commodore and Officer Commanding Junior Command & Staff School, who is of Group Captain rank.

Mission
To educate senior air leaders in Doctrine, Policy, Strategy and Air power employment concept.and also prepare for war.

Alumni from allied countries
Officers from allied countries including Bangladesh, China, Egypt, Indonesia, Iran, Iraq, Jordan, Kenya, Kuwait, Libya, Malaysia, Nigeria, Qatar, Saudi Arabia, Sri Lanka, Syria, Turkey, United Arab Emirates and Yemen are regular participants of Air War course.

Air War College Institute
In March 2021, the President of Pakistan Arif Alvi inaugurated the Pakistan Air Force (PAF) Air War College Institute in Karachi.

References

External links
PAF Air War College

Pakistan Air Force education and training
Military academies of Pakistan
Staff colleges
Educational institutions established in 1958
1958 establishments in Pakistan